Haven on the Hill is a 1956 Australian documentary produced by Ken G. Hall. It was one of Hall's favourite of his later movies.

It screened in some cinemas as a support feature.

References

1956 films
Australian documentary films
1950s English-language films
1956 documentary films